A New Black Poet - Small Talk at 125th and Lenox, also known simply as Small Talk at 125th and Lenox, is the debut album of recording artist Gil Scott-Heron, released in 1970 on Flying Dutchman Records. Recording sessions for the album were originally said to have taken place live at a New York nightclub located on the corner of 125th Street and Lenox Avenue, but liner notes included in the 2012 box set The Revolution Begins: The Flying Dutchman Masters, Scott-Heron himself insists that a small audience was brought to 'the studio' and seated on 'folding chairs'. By the time of the recordings, Scott-Heron had published a volume of poetry and his first novel, The Vulture. Well received by music critics who found Scott-Heron's material imaginative, Small Talk at 125th and Lenox has been described as "a volcanic upheaval of intellectualism and social critique" by Allmusic editor John Bush.

Track listing

"Who'll Pay Reparations on My Soul?" runs at 5:14 on CD reissue.

Personnel
 David Barnes – percussion, vocals
 Charlie Saunders, Eddie Knowles – congas
 Gil Scott-Heron – guitar, piano, vocals
Technical
 Charles Stewart – cover art
 Bob Thiele – producer

Legacy
Leon Bridges performed a new rendition of "Whitey on the Moon" in the 2018 Damien Chazelle film First Man, which was also included on the film's soundtrack album.

Notes

References

External links
 Small Talk at 125th and Lenox at Discogs

Gil Scott-Heron albums
Albums produced by Bob Thiele
1970 debut albums
1970 live albums
Flying Dutchman Records live albums
Spoken word albums by American artists
RCA Records live albums